The 2017–18 Saint Peter's Peacocks basketball team represented Saint Peter's University during the 2017–18 NCAA Division I men's basketball season. The Peacocks, led by 12th-year head coach John Dunne, played their home games at the Yanitelli Center in Jersey City, New Jersey as members of the Metro Atlantic Athletic Conference. They finished the season 14–18 overall, 6–12 in MAAC play to finish in ninth place. As the No. 9 seed at the MAAC tournament, they defeated No. 8 seed Monmouth and upset No. 1 seed Rider to advance to the semifinals, where they lost to No. 4 seed Iona.

After the end of the season, head coach John Dunne left Saint Peter's to take the same position at Marist College. On April 10, 2018, Seton Hall assistant coach Shaheen Holloway was hired as his replacement.

Previous season
The Peacocks finished the 2016–17 season 23–13, 14–6 in MAAC play to finish in second place. They defeated Canisius in the MAAC tournament before losing in the semifinals to Monmouth. They were invited to the CollegeInsider.com Tournament where they defeated Albany, Texas State, and Furman to advance to the CIT Championship. There they defeated Texas A&M–Corpus Christi 62–61 to become CIT champions.

Roster

Schedule and results

|-
!colspan=9 style="background:#; color:#;"| Non-conference regular season

|-
!colspan=9 style="background:#; color:#;"| MAAC regular season

|-
!colspan=9 style="background:#; color:#;"| MAAC tournament

References

Saint Peter's Peacocks men's basketball seasons
Saint Peter's